Yasuharu is a masculine Japanese given name.

Possible writings
Yasuharu can be written using different combinations of kanji characters. Here are some examples:

康治, "healthy, to manage"
康春, "healthy, spring"
康晴, "healthy, clear (weather)"
康温, "healthy, to warm up"
靖治, "peaceful, to manage"
靖春, "peaceful, spring"
靖晴, "peaceful, clear (weather)"
靖温, "peaceful, to warm up"
安治, "tranquil, to manage"
安春, "tranquil, spring"
安晴, "tranquil, clear (weather)"
保治, "preserve, to manage"
保春, "preserve, spring"
保温, "preserve, to warm up"
泰治, "peaceful, to manage"
泰春, "peaceful, spring"
泰晴, "peaceful, clear (weather)"
易治, "divination, to manage"
易春, "divination, spring"
恭治, "respectful, to manage"

The name can also be written in hiragana やすはる or katakana ヤスハル.

Notable people with the name
, Japanese Paralympic swimmer
, Japanese film director
, Japanese golfer
, Japanese musician
, Japanese footballer and manager
, Japanese figure skater
, Japanese footballer and manager
, Japanese anime composer
, Japanese daimyō

Japanese masculine given names